William Powers (born March 14, 1961) is an American writer, journalist, and technologist.  He is the author of Hamlet's BlackBerry: A Practical Philosophy for Building a Good Life in the Digital Age.

Life and career
Powers grew up in Rhode Island and graduated from Harvard University with a degree in history and literature. He did graduate study in Spain, then moved to Washington, DC, where he was a U.S. Senate aide working on foreign relations, intelligence and military affairs.

Then, Powers joined The Washington Post. His writing has appeared in The Atlantic, The New York Times and many other publications. He created The New Republic’s first media column, and wrote a column about the intersection of media and politics that appeared in Atlantic Media’s National Journal and The Atlantic online.

Awards, fellowships and talks
Powers is a two-time winner of the National Press Club’s Rowse Award for media criticism. He was a Media Fellow at Harvard’s Shorenstein Center  and a resident fellow at the MacDowell Colony.

He has given keynote talks at conferences such as South by Southwest and the Aspen Ideas Festival.

Bibliography
 Hamlet's Blackberry: A Practical Philosophy for Building a Good Life in the Digital Age HarperCollins, 2010.

References

External links

21st-century American novelists
Living people
People from Providence, Rhode Island
Novelists from Rhode Island
Harvard University alumni
The Washington Post people
1961 births